Macon High School may refer to:

Macon High School (Mississippi)
Macon High School (Illinois)
Macon High School (Missouri)